Round Prairie is an unincorporated community in Douglas County, Oregon, United States. Round Prairie is located along Interstate 5 north of Myrtle Creek. The extent of the business district is at I-5 Exit 113.

References

Unincorporated communities in Douglas County, Oregon
Unincorporated communities in Oregon